Gopynathan Velayudhan Nair (2 November 1937 – 29 January 2008), popularly known by the stage name Bharat Gopy, was an Indian actor, producer, and director. Considered one of the greatest actors in the history of Indian cinema, Gopy was one of the first actors to be associated with the New Wave cinema movement in Kerala during the 1970s.

Bharat Gopy has won many awards, including the National Film Award for Best Actor for his role as Sankarankutty in Kodiyettam (1977), and hence he got the name Bharath. His well-known roles include Aiyappan in Yavanika, Vasu Menon in Palangal, Prof. "Shakespeare" Krishna Pillai in Kattathe Kilikoodu, Dushasana Kurup in Panchavadi Palam, Nandagopal in Ormakkayi, Mammachan in Adaminte Vaariyellu, Shankaran in Chidambaram, and Krishnan Raju in Aghaat. He won four Kerala State Film Awards for Best Actor for various roles.

As a filmmaker he is known for Ulsavapittennu (1989) and Yamanam (1991). He produced the 1993 film Padheyam directed by Bharathan. In 1991 the Government of India honoured him with the Padma Shri for his contributions towards the arts. In 1994, he authored the book Abhinayam Anubhavam, which won the National Film Award for Best Book on Cinema.

Early life and family
Bharat Gopy was born on 2 November 1937 at Chirayinkeezhu in Thiruvananthapuram District of the state of Kerala as the youngest of four children to Kochuveetil Velayudhan Pillai and Parvathyamma. He completed his BSc. Degree from University College, Thiruvananthapuram. Immediately after his studies, he was employed as Lower Division Clerk in the Kerala Electricity Board.

He is married to Jayalakshmy S. V. The couple has a son, writer-actor Murali Gopy, and a daughter, Dr. Minu Gopy.

Career

Stage actor

Gopy began his acting career as a theatre actor at Prasadhana Little Theatres under G. Sankara Pillai.  His first stage appearance was in the role of Raaghavan in the play Abhayarthikal.  Later on, he became associated with Thiruvarange under Kaavalam Narayana Panicker. He has also written five plays and directed three.

Film actor

Gopy became interested in cinema through the Chitralekha Film Society, founded by Adoor Gopalakrishnan. He made his movie debut in Adoor's Swayamvaram in 1972 in a small role. He did the lead role of Sankarankutty in Adoor's next film, Kodiyettam (1977), a performance for which he won the National Award for Best Actor. He was also noted for his performances in movies like Ormakkayi, Yavanika, Panchavadi Palam and Adaminte Vaariyellu. Besides Malayalam movies, he acted in two Hindi movies, Aaghat and Satah Se Uthata Aadmi. Gopy was a film director and producer as well. Gopy was paralysed by a stroke on 20 February 1986, at the zenith of his career.

He was awarded the Padma Shri in 1991.

In 1979, Gopy directed the movie Njattadi with Murali in lead role.  The movie was only screened twice and the print is now lost. He directed three more movies Ulsavapittennu,  Yamanam and Ente Hridhayathinte Utama. His Yamanam, about a physically disabled person, was awarded Best Film on social issues by the National Award Jury in 1991.

On 24 January 2008, Gopy was hospitalised with chest pain. He died five days later following a cardiac arrest. His last role was in Balachandra Menon's De Ingottu Nokkiye (2008).

Author

Gopy authored two books. His book Abhinayam Anubhavam (Acting, Experience), won the National Film Award for Best Book on Cinema in 1994. In 2003, Nataka Niyogam, his book on drama won the Kerala State Drama Awards for Best Book on Drama.

Filmography

Actor

Director

Producer

Awards

International awards and honours
 Special Jury Award at the Asia Pacific International Film Festival, Tokyo (1985)
 A five-film retrospective of his films was held in Paris by the Government of France (1985). The only other Indian actors to be awarded this honour are Smita Patil, Naseeruddin Shah, Om Puri, Rajesh Khanna and Amitabh Bachchan

Civilian awards
Padma Shri – 1991

National Film Awards
Best Actor – Kodiyettam – 1977
Best Film on Other Social Issues – Yamanam – 1991
Best Book on Cinema – Abhinayam Anubhavam – 1995

V. Shantaram Award
 Best Film Award – Padheyam – 1993 (as producer)

Kerala State Film Awards
Best Actor – Kodiyettam – 1977
Best Actor – Ormakkayi – 1982
Best Actor – Ente Mamattikkuttiyammakku, Eenam, Ettillam, Kattathe Kilikoodu – 1983
Best Actor – Chidambaram – 1985

Filmfare Awards
 1982 – Best Actor – Ormakkayi
 1983 - Best Actor - Kattathe Kilikkoodu

Other awards
 1994 – Kerala Sangeetha Nataka Akademi Fellowship
 Four critics awards
 Two Gulf Malayali association awards

References

External links
https://web.archive.org/web/20160304040405/http://en.msidb.org/displayProfile.php?category=actors&artist=Bharath%20Gopy&limit=74

Film directors from Thiruvananthapuram
Male actors from Thiruvananthapuram
Kerala State Film Award winners
2008 deaths
1937 births
Male actors in Malayalam cinema
Filmfare Awards South winners
Malayalam film directors
Best Actor National Film Award winners
20th-century Indian male actors
20th-century Indian film directors
Recipients of the Padma Shri in arts
Indian male film actors
Film producers from Thiruvananthapuram
21st-century Indian male actors
21st-century Indian film directors
Directors who won the Best Film on Other Social Issues National Film Award
Recipients of the Kerala Sangeetha Nataka Akademi Fellowship